Faiz Salleh (born 17 July 1992) is a Singaporean former footballer who last played as a right-back for Hougang United

Career
Faiz Salleh played in the S.League for Courts Young Lions and currently Hougang United. The highlight of his career came in July 2014, in which he scored a goal in the 3–0 triumph over reigning champions Balestier Khalsa in the 2014 Singapore League Cup.

References

External links

1992 births
Living people
Singaporean footballers
Hougang United FC players
Association football midfielders
Singapore Premier League players
Young Lions FC players